Caravanserai is the fourth studio album by American rock band Santana, released on October 11, 1972. The album marked a period of transition for Santana as it was the band's last to feature several key early members, while shifting in a more instrumental, progressive jazz fusion direction. It sold in fewer quantities than the band's previous chart-topping albums, stalling at No. 8 on the Billboard LPs chart, but has been critically acclaimed.

Release and promotion 
The album was mixed and released in both stereo and quadraphonic. It was released on October 11, 1972. The album was supported with a tour, which spanned the Americas, Europe, Asia, and Oceania and lasted from September 1972 to December 1973. The shows on July 3 and 4, 1973 at the Osaka Kosei Nenkin Kaikan in Osaka, Japan, were released as the triple vinyl LP Lotus.

The inner cover carried a quote by Paramahansa Yogananda:

In 2000 SME records in Japan, part of Sony Music, also released the remastered version as an SACD. This disc contains the stereo mix only.

The album was remastered in 2003 for re-release on Legacy/Columbia/SME.

Reception 

The album reached number eight in the Billboard 200 chart and number six in the R&B Albums chart in 1972.

The album was regarded as an artistic success, but the musical changes that began on its release in 1972 marked the start of a fall in Santana's commercial popularity. In a 2013 interview, drummer and album co-producer Michael Shrieve recalled that Columbia Records president Clive Davis, upon first hearing the finished album, told Santana he was committing "career suicide."

A 1976 review in Rolling Stone by Ralph Gleason said the album affirmed and "speaks directly to the universality of man, both in the sound of the music and in the vocals." Caravanserai was also voted number 609 in the third edition of Colin Larkin's All Time Top 1000 Albums (2000).

Track listing 

On the Q8 quad version, "Song of the Wind" and "La Fuente del Ritmo"—the next to last tracks on each side of the LP—were traded to even the timing for the tape.

Personnel 
 Carlos Santana – lead guitar (2-4, 8, 9), guitar (5, 6, 10), vocals (4, 6, 8), percussion (1, 8)
 Neal Schon – guitar (1, 3–6, 8–10)
 Gregg Rolie – organ (2-6, 8, 10), electric piano (6), vocals (4), piano
 Douglas Rauch – bass (2-6), guitar (2-3)
 Douglas Rodrigues – guitar (2)
 Wendy Haas – piano (1, 8)
 Tom Rutley – acoustic bass (1, 6, 8–10)
 Michael Shrieve – drums (1-6, 8–10), percussion, vocals (8)
 José "Chepito" Areas – percussion, congas (7), timbales (2-4, 6–7, 9–10), bongos (8)
 James Mingo Lewis – percussion (1, 8–9), congas (2-10), bongos (7), vocals (6), acoustic piano (9)
 Armando Peraza – percussion (8), bongos (9)
 Hadley Caliman – saxophone intro (1), flute (10)
 Rico Reyes – vocals (6)
 Lenny White – castanets (6)
 Tom Coster – electric piano (9)
 Tom Harrell – orchestra arrangement (10)

Production 
 Produced by Carlos Santana & Mike Shrieve
 Recorded & engineered by Glen Kolotkin & Mike Larner
 Recorded at Columbia Studios, San Francisco, California March, April, & May 1972
  April 6, recorded All the Love of the Universe

Charts

Weekly charts

Year-end charts

Certifications

References

Santana (band) albums
1972 albums
Columbia Records albums
Albums produced by Carlos Santana
Jazz fusion albums by American artists
Jazz fusion albums by Mexican artists